Stewart's or Stewarts can refer to:

Stewart's Fountain Classics, brand of soft drink
Stewart's Restaurants, chain of restaurants where the soft drink was originally sold
Stewart's wilt, bacterial disease affecting maize
Stewart's (department store), defunct Baltimore, Maryland-based chain of department stores
Stewart Dry Goods, defunct Louisville, Kentucky-based chain of department stores
A.T. Stewart and Company, Alexander Turney Stewart's New York City department store 
Stewarts Supermarket Limited, former chain of supermarkets in Northern Ireland
Stewart's Shops, chain of convenience stores in Upstate New York
Stewart's theorem in trigonometry
House of Stuart (also spelt "Stewart"), rulers of Scotland from the 14th century and England from the 17th century

See also
Stuart's Department Stores of New England